In statistics, a polykay, or generalised k-statistic, (denoted ) is a statistic defined as a linear combination of sample moments.

Etymology
The word polykay was coined by American mathematician John Tukey in 1956, from poly, "many" or "much", and kay, the phonetic spelling of the letter "k", as in k-statistic.

References

Symmetric functions
Statistical inference